The 2019 Mississippi gubernatorial election took place on November 5, 2019, to choose the next Governor of Mississippi. Incumbent Governor Phil Bryant was ineligible to run for a third term due to term limits. The Democratic Party nominated incumbent Attorney General Jim Hood, the only Democrat holding statewide office in Mississippi; the Republican Party nominated incumbent Lieutenant Governor Tate Reeves. In the general election, Reeves defeated Hood by a margin of 5.08%, the closest gubernatorial election in Mississippi since 1999, with Reeves significantly underperforming Trump who won the state by 17 points, 3 years prior.

This is the first time since 1987 that the Democratic candidate has carried Warren and Madison counties in a gubernatorial election, and the last gubernatorial election in Mississippi in which the winner was determined in part by an electoral college of state legislative districts instead of a popular vote.

Background
Situated in the Deep South as a socially conservative Bible Belt state, Mississippi is one of the most Republican states in the country. No Democrat has been elected to the governorship since Ronnie Musgrove in 1999. However, the state's Democratic Attorney General, Jim Hood, who had held his office since 2004 and had yet to lose a statewide election, put the Republican's winning streak of four elections in a row to the test, as the race became unusually competitive. Reeves defeated Hood in the general election by a margin of 5.1%, making this the closest a Democrat had come to winning a Mississippi gubernatorial election since 1999. Hood pulled off the best performance by a Democrat since the 2003 Mississippi gubernatorial election, when fellow Democrat Ronnie Musgrove took 45.81% of the vote. Hood flipped the counties of Chickasaw, Lafayette, Madison, Panola, and Warren, which had all voted for Republican Donald Trump in the 2016 United States presidential election.

Uniquely among the states, the Constitution of Mississippi establishes a sort of electoral college at the state level. For the election of governor. Article 5, Section 140 of the state constitution states that each state House district is assigned an electoral vote, and that a candidate running for governor must receive a majority of electoral votes (essentially, they must win a majority of state House districts) in addition to winning a majority of the popular vote in order to be elected governor. Article 5, Section 141 of the state constitution states that if no candidate wins both a popular and electoral vote majority, the state House of Representatives is assigned to decide the winner, choosing from the two highest popular vote winners. This provision came into play only one time in the state's history; Democratic candidate Ronnie Musgrove in the 1999 gubernatorial election garnered a plurality, but not a majority; the House selected Musgrove.

In the lead-up to the election, controversy emerged over these constitutional provisions establishing a state system of electoral votes, with a federal lawsuit claiming the provisions are racially biased. These provisions were put in place with the 1890 Mississippi Constitution, itself established by the segregationist Redeemers and overturning the Reconstruction-era 1868 Constitution, as part of Jim Crow Era policy to minimize the power of African Americans in politics. Because of this, as well as present gerrymandering that packs African Americans into a small number of districts, the plaintiffs claim the provisions should be struck down on the basis of racial bias.

On 3 November 2020 an amendment was passed removing the electoral college with 79% of the vote.

Republican primary

Candidates

Nominee
Tate Reeves, lieutenant governor of Mississippi

Eliminated in runoff
Bill Waller Jr., former chief justice of the Mississippi State Supreme Court and son of former Democratic Governor William "Bill" Waller. Sr (1972–1976)

Eliminated in primary
Robert Foster, Mississippi state representative

Withdrawn
Hal Marx, mayor of Petal (endorsed Tate Reeves)

Declined
Thomas Duff, businessman
Lynn Fitch, Mississippi state treasurer (running for Mississippi attorney general)
Gerard Gibert, businessman and lottery board member
Philip Gunn, speaker of the Mississippi House of Representatives
Trent Lott, former U.S. senator
 Chris McDaniel, Mississippi states senator and candidate for the U.S. Senate in 2014 and 2018 (endorsed Tate Reeves)
Mike Randolph, presiding justice of the Mississippi State Supreme Court
Andy Taggart, former chief of staff to Governor Kirk Fordice (running for Mississippi attorney general)

Endorsements

Polling

Results

Runoff

Democratic primary

Candidates

Nominee
 Jim Hood, Mississippi attorney general

Eliminated in primary
 Michael Brown
 William Bond Compton Jr., candidate for governor of Mississippi in 2007 and 2011, candidate for the U.S. Senate in 2014, nominee for the Mississippi House of Representatives in the 83rd district in 2015
 Robert J. Ray
 Robert Shuler Smith, Hinds County district attorney
 Gregory Wash
 Velesha Williams, former director for the Metro Jackson Community Prevention Coalition and former U.S. Army officer
 Albert Wilson, businessman and community organizer

Withdrawn
Phillip West, former state representative and former mayor of Natchez (endorsed Jim Hood)

Declined
 Anthony Witherspoon, mayor of Magnolia

Endorsements

Polling

Results

Other candidates

Constitution Party
Declared
Bob Hickingbottom

Independents
Declared
David Singletary, U.S. Air Force veteran and former hotel owner

General election

Predictions

Debates

Endorsements

Polling

with Tate Reeves, Jim Hood, and Bill Waller Jr.

with Bill Waller Jr. and Jim Hood

Results

See also
2019 United States gubernatorial elections
2019 United States elections
2019 Mississippi elections

Notes

Partisan clients

References

External links
 Mississippi State Constitution 

Official campaign websites
 Tate Reeves (R) for Governor
 Jim Hood (D) for Governor 
 Bob Hickingbottom (C) for Governor 
 David Singletary (I) for Governor

Gubernatorial
2019
Mississippi
Mississippi gubernatorial election